Silks and Saddles is a 1936 American film starring Herman Brix. It was one of a number of films he made for producer Sam Katzman.

It was partly shot at the Pomona Racetrack.

References

External links
Silks and Saddles at IMDb
Silks and Saddles at TCMDB

1936 films
Victory Pictures films
American sports comedy films
1930s sports comedy films
Films directed by Robert F. Hill
American horse racing films
American action comedy films
1930s action comedy films
American black-and-white films
1936 comedy films
1930s English-language films
1930s American films